Mark Timothy Edgell (born 2 November 1961) is a British economist, and a former council leader of Rotherham Metropolitan Borough Council.

Career

Rotherham Metropolitan Borough Council
He was a councillor for 13 years.

He was leader of Rotherham Council from 2000 to 2003.

Personal life
He married Clare Elliott in February 1990 in Rotherham. He has a son (born in March 1992) and daughter, and has remarried.

References

External links
 BBC September 2014
 Rotherham NHS Trust

1961 births
Councillors in South Yorkshire
Labour Party (UK) councillors
People from Rotherham
Politics of Rotherham
British economists
Living people
Leaders of local authorities of England